Kilkenny is a nitrogenated Irish cream ale from the makers of Guinness, which originated in Kilkenny, Ireland.  The brand is managed and produced by Diageo.  It is available in draught, bottles and cans.  It is brewed in Ireland. Kilkenny is similar to Smithwick's Draught; however, it has less hop finish, and it has a nitrogenated cream head similar to Guinness.  The 'Kilkenny' name was originally used during the 1980s and 1990s to market a stronger version of Smithwick's for the European and Canadian markets due to difficulty in pronunciation of the word 'Smithwick's'. It now refers to a similar yet distinct beer.

Kilkenny was brewed in St. Francis Abbey Brewery in Kilkenny, which was the oldest operating brewery in Ireland until its closure in 2013.  It is now brewed at St. James's Gate brewery, Dublin.  It is served in similar manner to Guinness; fully risen with a head of ¾ to 1" approx.  The ingredients are water, malted barley, roasted malted barley, hops, and yeast.

While Ireland is the primary market for the brand, Australia and Canada are the two largest importers of Kilkenny.

Export

Australia and New Zealand
Kilkenny is available on tap in a number of Australian and New Zealand bars and pubs, where it is served, as with locally brewed draught Guinness, on a mixture of 70% nitrogen and 30% carbon dioxide through a special tap to render a creamy head. It is available in 440ml cans from some bottle stores.

Canada
Kilkenny is also available in Canada, including in Montreal's Irish pubs, and the LCBO also saw an increase in sales after July 2013. Kilkenny grew in popularity after several Canadian personalities, including Mike Myers and Drake, were pictured with a Kilkenny "in hand".

References

1710 establishments in Ireland
Beer in Ireland
Diageo beer brands
Irish brands